Roosevelt School in Boise, Idaho, is a 2-story, brick and concrete elementary school designed by Wayland & Fennell and constructed by O.W. Allen in 1919. The building features Classical Revival design elements and a flat roof with a parapet above a horizontal course of decorative concrete.

The 1919 design included eight classrooms, office, library, auditorium, and gymnasium. The building required 450,000 bricks. In 1946 a 4-room expansion was added to the east side, and a 3-room expansion was added in 1951.

References

External links
 
 Roosevelt School website

Further reading
 J. Howard Moon, A Centennial History of Schools of the State of Idaho (State School Boards Association, 1990), pp 1-12

		
National Register of Historic Places in Boise, Idaho
Neoclassical architecture in Idaho
Buildings and structures completed in 1919